Milan Dufek (6 May 1944 in Prague – 17 November 2005 in San Andrés, Colombia) was a Czech singer, composer, guitarist and flautist. He was a co-founder of the Czech pop folk band Rangers.

Dufek and Antonín Hájek founded The Rangers in 1964. The band was renamed Plavci (Swimmers) in 1971 due to concerns about sharing its name with "American killers in Vietnam" (the United States Army Rangers). Band member Radek Tomášek left Plavci in 1973 due to rivalry with Dufek. The band's name reverted to Rangers in 1989.

Dufek was the composer of several successful songs. He founded the Nadace Dětské Srdce (Children's Heart Foundation) to support treatment for pediatric heart defects.

Dufek died in 2005 in a scuba diving accident on the island of San Andrés, Colombia, when he collided with a boat.

References

 

1944 births
2005 deaths
Czech male composers
Czech folk musicians
Czech guitarists
Male guitarists
Czech singer-songwriters
Sport deaths in Colombia
Underwater diving deaths
Czechoslovak male singers
Folk-pop singers
20th-century guitarists
20th-century Czech male singers
Musicians from Prague